Treasure Island Ferry Terminal is a ferry terminal on Treasure Island, San Francisco adjacent to the Administration Building. Treasure Island Community Development began construction of the terminal in 2019 in anticipation of the island's redevelopment with new homes and residents. Ferries operate daily between the San Francisco Ferry Building and the Treasure Island terminal and are operated by Prop SF. The terminal was expected to open in 2021, but officially opened on March 1, 2022, with the start of daily service.

References 

Treasure Island, San Francisco
Ferry terminals in the San Francisco Bay Area
Proposed public transportation in the San Francisco Bay Area
Public transportation in San Francisco